The ASM-DT is a Russian folding-stock underwater firearm. It emerged in the 1990s.

History and design
The introduction of the APS Underwater Assault Rifle solved the problem of how frogmen guarding a naval base could be armed, but there remained the problem of how to arm naval Spetsnaz combat frogmen when they were deployed on assault missions. These forces required a weapon able to provide them with a level of firepower that would be the same whether they were on the surface or underwater. The APS was of little use out of water, because under those conditions it was inaccurate, with an effective range of only 50 meters. In addition, when it was used out of the water, it wore out quickly, with a barrel life dropping from approximately 2000 rounds to only 180 to 200 rounds.

For this reason, the naval Spetsnaz forces often fell back on using the SPP-1 pistol for underwater fighting, and the AK-74 rifle for combat out of water. The commandos thought that this arrangement was unsatisfactory, and there continued to be demand for a new weapon, an underwater automatic rifle that would be as effective as an APS underwater and as an AK-74 out of water. As a result, in 1991, at the Artillery Engineering Institute in Tula, Russia, the ASM-DT project was created, with Professor Yuriy Danilov as the rifle's project engineer.

To meet the requirements, it had to be considered that a long smoothbore barrel was best for the new rifle to fire underwater, but a rifled barrel was necessary to gain any significant range while above water. To solve this problem and get a true 'hybrid' design, the rifle would have to fire two types of projectile, one underwater, and another above water. The rifle was designed with two feed slots, able to accept two magazines at the same time, to make the transition seamless. Professor Danilov designed the ASM-DT to fire both 5.45 x 39 mm 7N6 (a version of the standard Soviet ammunition), adapted to the caliber of the ASM-DT, and also 5.45 x 39 mm MGTS (aka 5.66×39/120 mm MPS), underwater ammunition like that of the existing APS. The ASM-DT uses the same magazines as the APS while under water, and AK-74 magazines above water. The magazine release shifts forward when using AK-74 magazines, and the gas system automatically adjusts for firing out of water. To enable accurate shooting when outside of water, the barrel is rifled, however it has shallow grooves running along its length, which expel some gases ahead of the bullet and blow any water out of the barrel. This prevents the barrel from bursting if the rifle should need to be taken to the surface quickly, and fired outside of water without being drained first. In addition, the rifle can be equipped with a GP-25 grenade launcher, a bayonet, or a PBS sound and flash suppressor.

Additional accessories include: flame arrestor, a blank firing device for low-noise shooting (UPMS), various types of optical and night sights, and tactical lights. The rifle has a folding stock, which, along with the pistol grip and handguard, are made of impact resistant plastic.

The combat effectiveness of ASM-DT is comparable with the AK-74 and APS when fired in air and water environments, respectively.  The Russian Federation accepted the ASM-DT into service in the year 2000.

See APS amphibious rifle for considerations involving shooting power underwater.

See also

Bibliography

Leszek Erenfeicht, Rosyjska broń strzelecka dla płetwonurków, Strzał 5/2003. ISSN 1644-4906
Modern Firearms - ASM-DT  Morskoj Lev  (Sea Lion) dual medium (underwater and above water) assault rifle

External links
 Modern Firearms - ASM-DT  Morskoj Lev  (Sea Lion) dual medium (underwater and above water) assault rifle

Assault rifles of Russia
Underwater rifles
Russian inventions
Tula Arms Plant products
Military equipment introduced in the 1990s